Sugar and Spice is an American sitcom that aired on CBS from March 30, 1990 to May 25, 1990.

Premise
The small town of Ponca City, Oklahoma, was the setting for this blue collar series about two middle-aged African American sisters. Loretta and Vickilyn (Loretta Devine and Vickilyn Reynolds) had very different personalities. Vickilyn was conservative and quiet, a divorcee making her living with Small World Miniatures, a mail-order business run out of her converted garage. Her gregarious sister Loretta, an aspiring actress with a roving eye for good-looking men, was biding time working as a hostess at Cafe Jacques, where the manager Jacques (Leslie Jordan) was also seen.

Living with then was their teenage niece Toby (LaVerne Anderson), the only child of their late sister, whose good intentions were sometimes derailed when she took bad advice from her best friend Ginger (Dana Hill). Bonnie (Stephanie Hodge), who had a tempestuous relationship with her trucker husband Cliff (Gerrit Graham), was Vickilyn's assistant at Small World Miniatures.

Ralph and Brian (Troy Searcy, Bumper Robinson) were schoolmates of Toby's.

Cast
 Vickilyn Reynolds as Vickilyn Fontaine-Clayton
 Loretta Devine as Loretta Fontaine
 LaVerne Anderson as Toby Reed
 Dana Hill as Ginger
 Stephanie Hodge as Bonnie Buttram

Recurring
 Leslie Jordan as Monsieur Jacques
 Fitz Houston as Deputy

Guest Stars
Dorian Harewood as Marcus
Michael Talbott as Joe
Gerrit Graham as Cliff
Rick Fitts as Doug
Willie C. Carpenter as Binder
Elmarie Wendel as Bag Lady
Nicholas Pryor as Mr.Prescott
Maureen Arthur as New Yorker

Episodes

References

CBS original programming
1990s American black sitcoms
1990s American sitcoms
1990 American television series debuts
1990 American television series endings
Television shows set in Oklahoma
Television series by Sony Pictures Television